Adam Łukasz Królikiewicz (9 December 1894 – 4 May 1966, aged 71) was a Polish horse rider, major of Polish Army, who competed in the 1924 Summer Olympics. He was born in Lviv. He died in Konstancin-Jeziorna. He was a member of Polish Legions and fought in World War I.

In 1924 he and his horse Picador won the bronze medal in the individual jumping competition. As part of the Polish jumping team they finishing sixth in the team jumping competition.

In 1966 he died in an accident, when he fell from a horse during the filming of Andrzej Wajda's film Popioły.

Honours and awards
 Silver Cross of the Order of Virtuti Militari
 Cross of Independence
 Silver Cross of Merit - twice

References

External links
  (archive)
 
 
 
 

1894 births
1966 deaths
Sportspeople from Lviv
Polish Austro-Hungarians
People from the Kingdom of Galicia and Lodomeria
Polish male equestrians
Show jumping riders
Olympic equestrians of Poland
Equestrians at the 1924 Summer Olympics
Olympic bronze medalists for Poland
Polish legionnaires (World War I)
Polish people of World War I
Recipients of the Silver Cross of the Virtuti Militari
Recipients of the Silver Cross of Merit (Poland)
Recipients of the Cross of Independence
Olympic medalists in equestrian
Deaths by horse-riding accident
Medalists at the 1924 Summer Olympics
Polish Army officers